Pooja Lokesh is an Indian actress in the Tamil and Kannada film industry.

Personal life
She is the daughter of Lokesh and Girija Lokesh, and sister of Srujan Lokesh.

Partial filmography
 Tiger Galli (2017)
 Magic Ajji (2005)
 Chatrapathy (2004)
 Yuddha (1997)
 Ulta Palta (1997)
 Huliya (1996)

Television
Serials

Shows

See also

List of people from Karnataka
Cinema of Karnataka
List of Indian film actresses
Cinema of India

References

Living people
Kannada people
20th-century Indian actresses
21st-century Indian actresses
Indian film actresses
Actresses from Karnataka
Actresses in Kannada cinema
Date of birth missing (living people)
Actresses in Tamil television
1977 births